Priboy Rocks (‘Skali Priboy’ \ska-'li pri-'boy\) is the group of rocks off the east coast of Robert Island in the South Shetland Islands, Antarctica, extending  in east–west direction and  in north–south direction.

The rocks are named after the settlement of Priboy in Western Bulgaria.

Location

British mapping in 1968 and Bulgarian in 2009.

See also 
 Composite Antarctic Gazetteer
 List of Antarctic and sub-Antarctic islands
 List of Antarctic islands south of 60° S
 SCAR
 Territorial claims in Antarctica
 South Shetland Islands

Map
 L.L. Ivanov. Antarctica: Livingston Island and Greenwich, Robert, Snow and Smith Islands. Scale 1:120000 topographic map.  Troyan: Manfred Wörner Foundation, 2009.

References
 Bulgarian Antarctic Gazetteer. Antarctic Place-names Commission. (details in Bulgarian, basic data in English)
 Priboy Rocks. SCAR Composite Gazetteer of Antarctica

External links
 Priboy Rocks. Copernix satellite image

Rock formations of Robert Island
Bulgaria and the Antarctic